The Non-Attached Members (NI) are the deputies who are not members or related to any parliamentary group of the National Assembly of France.

16th legislature

15th legislature 
In the 15th legislature of the French Fifth Republic, National Rally MPs sat in this group.

References 

National Assembly (France)
Parliamentary groups in France
Independent politicians in France